The Church of St Michael and All Angels is a Grade I listed church in Martin Hussingtree, Worcestershire.

The west wall is probably of 12th century origin, but the remainder of the church was rebuilt in the early 13th century.

Thomas Tomkins was buried in the churchyard on 9 June 1656.

References

External links
 Official website

Grade I listed churches in Worcestershire